The Lancet Psychiatry is a peer-reviewed scientific journal published by Elsevier .

Abstracting and indexing 
The journal is abstracted and indexed in:
Science Citation Index Expanded
Scopus
Social Sciences Citation Index
Embase
MEDLINE

According to the Journal Citation Reports, the journal has a 2020 impact factor of 27.083.

References

External links

English-language journals
Elsevier academic journals
Psychiatry journals
Publications with year of establishment missing